The 2015 European Cup was an international rugby league football tournament. The tournament took place between 16 October and 7 November in Wales, France, Scotland and Ireland.

Scotland were the defending champions. Four teams competed in the 2015 event; Wales, Scotland, France and Ireland. Wales were crowned 2015 European Cup champions after winning all of their games putting them on top of the table with the maximum points tally of 6.

After the tournament's last game there would be no European Cup tournament until the 2018 Championship due to the events occurring such as the 2016 Four Nations, 2017 World Cup qualifying competitions and the 2017 World Cup Finals.

Teams

Squads

France
Head Coach:  Richard Agar

On 1 October, Richard Agar named the following 23 players as part of his squad in preparation for the tournament.

Ireland
Head Coach:  Mark Aston

On 2 October, Mark Aston named the following 22 players as part of his squad in preparation for the tournament.

On 6 November, Robbie Mulhern was a late call-up for Mark Aston's team in the lead up to their crucial final match against Wales.

Scotland
Head Coach:  Steve McCormack

On 30 September, Steve McCormack named the following 29 players as part of his squad in preparation for the tournament.

On 9 October, Steve McCormack brought in two new players to the squad after the withdrawals from seven players: Craig Borthwick, Mitch Stringer, Brett Carter, Jon Molloy, Callum Phillips and Brett Phillips. Billy McConnachie was also suspended for the first two games. The two new players McCormack brought in are: Louis Senter and Joe McLean.

On 7 November, Sam Brooks was called up to play for Steve McCormack's side in the final game of the tournament against France to fill in for injuries. Gavin Grant was also called up to play in the team, for the game against France, which became the youngest ever international senior Scottish team to play an international match with an average age of 22.

Wales
Head Coach:  John Kear
On 16 September, John's first selection move of 2015 was naming his new captain as Lloyd White.

On 29 September, John Kear named the following 24 players as part of his squad in preparation for the tournament.

On 2 October, Matty Fozard pulled out of the squad due to a broken jaw. He was replaced by Connor Farrer.

On 8 October, James Geurtjens of the Coventry Bears was called up into John Kear's squad.

On 12 October, captain Lloyd White withdrew from the team due to a knee injury. Craig Kopczak was therefore announced as the new captain.

On 21 October, Coventry Bears prop Morgan Evans replaced Ben Flower in the team.

Venues
The games will be played at the following venues in Wales, France, Scotland and Ireland.

Standings

Fixtures
Note*France vs Wales Round 2 fixture has been moved to the 30th due to France's fixture with England on 24 October before England's series against New Zealand.

Round 1

Round 2

Round 3

Matches details
All times are local: UTC+1/CET in French venues. UTC+0/WET in Irish venues. UTC+0/GMT in Welsh venues. UTC+0/GMT in Scottish venues.

Wales vs Scotland

 The victory for Wales ended their spree of 12 consecutive defeats with their last victory occurring four years ago.

France vs Ireland

Scotland vs Ireland

Wales vs France

With the defeat, France still haven’t won a test in South Wales since 1948.

France vs Scotland

Ireland vs Wales

Attendances

Broadcasting

beIN Sports broadcast both of France's home matches against Ireland and Scotland as well as their away match against Wales.

References

European Nations Cup
European Cup
European Cup
European Cup
European Cup
European Cup
European Cup
European Cup